Li Gonglin (李公麟, 1049–1106), style name Boshi, art name Longmian Jushi (龍眠居士, Householder of Sleeping Dragon), was a Chinese antiquarian, painter, and politician during the Northern Song Dynasty.

Born into a scholarly home near what is modern day Lu'an City, Li Gonglin passed the highest level of civil service examinations at 21 and became a civil officer. He became famous for his paintings of horses, then he turned to Buddhism and Taoism religious painting, as well as portrait and landscape painting. His painting style was attributed to the style of Gu Kaizhi and Wu Daozi. He made antiquarian contributions in the areas of copperware and Jade Seal dated between the Xia Dynasty and the Zhou Dynasty.

References

Further reading

External links
Li Gonglin and his painting gallery at China Online Museum
Three handscrolls by Li Gonglin in the collection of the Metropolitan Museum, New York

1049 births
1106 deaths
11th-century Chinese historians
11th-century Chinese painters
12th-century Chinese historians
12th-century Chinese painters
Buddhist artists
Chinese antiquarians
Historians from Anhui
Painters from Anhui
People from Lu'an
Religious artists
Song dynasty historians
Song dynasty painters
Song dynasty politicians from Anhui
11th-century antiquarians
12th-century antiquarians